Shola Lynch (born March 20, 1969) is an American filmmaker, artist and former child actress. She is best known for her films Chisholm '72: Unbought and Unbossed (2004) and Free Angela and All Political Prisoners (2012), both of which focus on African-American women and political history. She is a member of the Academy of Motion Picture Arts and Sciences.

Early life and education

Lynch was born in Buffalo, New York, and grew up in New York City. She is the oldest daughter of Hollis and Sharon Lynch (née Fisher) and has a younger sister named Nnenna. She is mixed race. Her father is originally from Trinidad & Tobago and her mother is Canadian.

At the age of two, she began acting on the PBS children's series Sesame Street and did so until she was 6.

She began running and training as a track-and-field athlete in sixth grade specializing in 800-meter and 1500-meter races. By 13, she began breaking national records for her age bracket in 800-, 1500-, and 1600-meter races. She later moved from New York to Texas with the ambition to race in track at the Olympics and continued to win in events up to 1992. She did not attend the 2000 Olympic Games however, due to a back injury.

Lynch graduated from Hunter College High School and the University of Texas at Austin (UT). She graduated from UT's Plan II honors program and was the captain of its track team two years running.  She then attended the University of California-Riverside where she earned a graduate degree in Public Resource Management and in American history. Her master's thesis was an exhibit at The UCR Museum of Photography called "How Far Have We Come?" examining the different media representations of black people to highlight racial stereotypes throughout history. Lynch also achieved a master's in journalism from Columbia University.

Career

After earning her degree Lynch moved back to New York from Texas to attempt to began an art career. This did not work out due to lack of funds for artists in New York at this time.

Instead she got a job at Ken Burns' production company and worked with him for five years on documentaries including his series Jazz (2000).

Her skills in film and background in history contributed to her research and production for other documentaries, such as HBO Sports' Do You Believe in Miracles? The Story of the 1980 U.S. Olympic Hockey Team (2001). She then worked on Matters of Race: EveryOther (2003), which focused on racialized issues in the United States.

Her interest in history and race lead to her to write, direct and produce her first independent film, Chisholm '72: Unbought and Unbossed. Lynch heard about Shirley Chisholm over the radio and this sparked old memories of her from her childhood. Having been inspired by Chisholm as a youth she made multiple attempts to contact her in order to get permission to create a film to inspire a new generation of young people.

Chisholm '72: Unbought and Unbossed was Lynch's directorial debut, which premiered at the Sundance Film Festival and won several awards including the George Foster Peabody Award.

The second film she directed, Free Angela and All Political Prisoners, came out in 2006 and profiled Angela Davis, who was an activist and professor in the 1970s. The film received honorable mention at the Tribeca Film Festival and won Best Theatrical Documentary at the 2014 NAACP Image Awards.

Lynch became a member of the Academy of Motion Picture Arts and Sciences in 2016.

Lynch received the Creative Capital grant in 2015 to sponsor the research and production of her next film, tentatively called The Outlaw. Since 2013, Lynch has worked at the New York Public Library Schomburg Center for Research in Black Culture as the Curator of the Moving Image and Recorded Sound Division.

Filmography

Personal life
Lynch lives in Harlem in New York City with her husband and their two children.

External links

References 

1969 births
20th-century African-American sportspeople
20th-century African-American women
21st-century African-American people
21st-century African-American women
Actresses from Buffalo, New York
African-American child actresses
African-American female track and field athletes
African-American film directors
African-American film producers
African-American screenwriters
African-American women artists
American child actresses
American female middle-distance runners
American filmmakers
American people of Canadian descent
American people of Trinidad and Tobago descent
Artists from Buffalo, New York
Columbia University Graduate School of Journalism alumni
Hunter College High School alumni
Living people
People from Buffalo, New York
Track and field athletes from New York City
University of Texas at Austin College of Liberal Arts alumni